Finally (or sometimes The Animals & Beyond) is a documentary film about Eric Burdon. It was released in 1991 on VHS and in 2003 on DVD. It features clips from 1964 to 1970 and some from 1991.

People who were interviewed in this documentary including Sammy Hagar, John Steel, Chas Chandler, Zoot Money, Hilton Valentine, Brian Auger and Eric Burdon.

Clips of John Weider, War and Jimi Hendrix were also shown.

The film shows live recordings of "See See Rider", "Talkin' 'Bout You", "Hey Gyp (Dig the Slowness)", "Wild Thing" (Jimi Hendrix), "Good Times", "Don't Let Me Be Misunderstood", "We Gotta Get Out of This Place" and video clips of "Monterey", "When I Was Young", "The House of the Rising Sun", "Spill the Wine" and many more. A short clip of "Don't Let Me Be Misunderstood" (performed by Burdon & Brian Auger Band) is also included.

In October 2008, the film was re-issued.

References

1991 films
Documentary films about singers
Direct-to-video documentary films
1991 documentary films